Thomas Sawyer (1874 – unknown) was an English footballer. His regular position was as a forward.

He played for Derby County (2 appearances as an inside forward in 1894–95 season), Newton Heath (6 appearances as an outside right in 1899–1900 and 1900–01 seasons) and Chesterfield (9 appearances in 1901–02 season).

References

External links
MUFCInfo.com profile

1874 births
Year of death missing
English footballers
Association football forwards
Derby County F.C. players
Manchester United F.C. players
Chesterfield F.C. players